Childhood studies or children's studies (CS) is a multidisciplinary field that seeks to understand the experience of childhood, both historically and in the contemporary world. CS views childhood as "a complex social phenomenon" with an emphasis on children's agency as social actors, and acknowledges that childhood is socially constructed as the concept of childhood is not universal. CS draws on scholarship in the social sciences (specifically anthropology, economics, history, and sociology), the humanities (especially literature, religion, philosophy, and the fine arts), and the behavioral sciences (with an emphasis on psychology).

History

Founding
The interdisciplinary field of children's studies was founded at Brooklyn College of The City University of New York in the fall of 1991. Its aim was to promote a unified approach to the study of children and youth across the arts, humanities, natural sciences, social sciences, medicine, and law. This new concept emphasized an interdisciplinary and comprehensive approach to studying children aged 0 to 18 years old. The concept of CS was introduced and coined in contradistinction to the Child Study Movement initiated by Stanley Hall at the turn of the 20th century, which focuses on child psychology and development.

After Brooklyn College initiated this field in 1991, other academic institutions established children's studies programs, and in subsequent years the concept of childhood studies and the field of children's studies emerged. Today there are children's studies and childhood studies programs at numerous academic institutions worldwide.

Brooklyn College also initiated the establishment of the "Sociology of Children." In August 1991 Gertrud Lenzer wrote an article titled "Is There Sufficient Interest to Establish a Sociology of Children?" in the ASA journal Footnotes. ASA President-Elect James S. Coleman wrote as an addendum to this article "I believe that the call for increased attention to the sociology of children is well-placed, and it may be that a new section of the ASA is the best way to do that." The new section within the American Sociological Association was officially established in 1992.

There is a conceptual confusion that now exists between Children's Studies and Childhood Studies. This is thought to have stemmed from the small time frame during which Brooklyn College established the "Sociology of Children" in America. European colleagues established the similarly named but fundamentally different "Sociology of Childhood" in Europe.

Whereas the field of "childhood studies" claims its major focus is "to understand childhood", the field of children's studies claims that children must be viewed in their fullness as human beings in a generational and social class, with civil, political, social, economic and cultural dimensions. In this wider and encompassing context, the study of "childhood" is viewed as a subfield of children's studies. The human rights of children represent a major framework for the interdisciplinary field of children's studies.

Academic growth, interdisciplinary subfields
In the 1990s, Northumbria University was one of the first to offer a degree in childhood studies in the UK. Rutgers University-Camden developed the first Childhood Studies Department in the United States to award degrees from BA through Ph.D. This is a multi-disciplinary department in which Ph.D. students study a range of methodologies to explore cultural constructions of childhood. In the United States there are now dozens of children/childhood "modules", minors, or concentrations available within degree programs. There are also BA and master's programs across the globe.

Rutgers University-Camden also operates The Center for Children's and Childhood Studies, the Rutgers University Press Book Series in Childhood Studies, and The Exploring Childhood Studies listserve, an online community of over 1500 academics and practitioners studying children and childhood in every discipline and around the world. The Children's Studies Center for Research, Policy, and Public Service was established at Brooklyn College in 1997. In 2011, the title of the children's studies program at Brooklyn College was officially changed to "Children and Youth Studies". Childhood, a major international journal in the field, was established in 1993. The Palgrave Handbook of Childhood Studies, edited by Jens Qvortrup, William Corsaro, and Michael-Sebastian Honig was published in 2009.

York University in Canada quotes Lenzer in its proposal for a new degree program in Children Studies, writing "In a special issue of The Lion and the Unicorn in 2001, Gertrud Lenzer, co-founder and Director of the Children's Studies Program and Children's Studies Center at Brooklyn College, provides a brief history of, and rationale for, the emerging field of children's studies. According to Lenzer, before the 1990s, most disciplines in the arts and sciences failed to "provide a special focus on children"; indeed, advertisers and politicians "discovered" childhood before scholars did. Only during the past two decades, Lenzer argues, has "an increasing number of disciplines in the arts and sciences. . . begun to manifest an interest in children and youth. In the humanities, these growing subfields include children's literature, the history of childhood, and the philosophy of children." However, Lenzer suggests, even "the recent sharpening focus on children and youth in the humanities, social sciences, and international law" limited the efficacy of studies of children and childhood because "the intellectual division of labor in children-related scholarship across the disciplines was largely adding new subspecialties of and within the disciplines themselves."

By contrast, Lenzer emphasizes the need for holistic, interdisciplinary—indeed, humanities-based— approaches to children's studies:  are not fully characterized by psychological developmental processes, nor ... by any single perspective. ...  also exist ... as individuals, as a social and cultural class, and as a historical generation."
York's children's studies program adopts many goals Lenzer proposes for this emerging area "as a genuinely interdisciplinary, multidisciplinary new field of study. By bringing carefully chosen knowledge of children from different studies to bear upon the class or category of children to students in a Liberal Arts course of learning, we hope that a more holistic understanding of children and childhood should emerge, which in the end will represent more than simply the sum of its parts. ... Children's Studies ... makes the ontological claim that children must be viewed in their fullness as human beings." The importance of this field of study was underscored in March 2005, at the "Off to See the Wizard: Quests and Memory in Children's Literature" conference, when Roni Natov, author of Poetics of Childhood (2002), suggested that "interdisciplinary childhood studies" would transform future understandings of children and children's literature."

International childhood studies
The emerging field of "international childhood studies" is a notable new development in the field of childhood studies. International childhood studies are interested in how global and international structures and processes shape children's lives and the cultures of childhood. Birkbeck College offers MSc and Ph.D. studies in international childhood studies in the Department of Geography, Environment, and Development Studies, reflecting the strong interest of this field in the intersections between childhood and international development. Karen Wells writes in Childhood in a Global Perspective (Polity 2009) that 'global processes and structures - especially the increasing influence of international law and international NGOs are reshaping childhood' (2009:1).

Further developments in this area include the launch in 2011 of a new journal, Global Studies of Childhood, and a two-year ESRC seminar series, Violence and Childhood: international perspectives (www.internationalchildhoodstudies.org). Other important developments include the establishment of the research Section "Sociology of Children and Youth" in the American Sociological Association and the thematic group on "Sociology of Childhood" in the International Sociological Association. For the "Sociology of Children and Youth" section, William Corsaro and Jeylan Mortimer were the first recipients of the Distinguished Career Awards and Viviana Zelizer and Jens Qvortrup were the first recipients of the Distinguished Career Service Awards.

US National Children's Study
The US National Children's Study was formulated by politicians who realized the importance of disciplines and the study of simple subjects. When compared to the British birth cohort studies, the US lacks a strong tradition for surveys of children. However, there have still been plenty of surveys focusing on their health. Certain theories claim that adults are mature and reasonable, whereas children are not as they are still developing.

It is also said childhood studies retains a modernist agenda. Due to children's position in society, there are multiple opportunities and ways for children to exercise their social agency. Theoretical advances made by psychology emphasize the need to contextualize the development of children.

See also 
 Otherness of childhood

References

Further reading 
Books
The Palgrave handbook of childhood studies, ed. by Jens Qvortrup, William A. Corsaro and Michael-Sebastian Honig, Basingstoke, Hampshire [etc.] : Palgrave Macmillan, 2009
Bernstein, Robin. [https://books.google.com/books?id=f_mgPpS-xXsC Innocence: Performing American Childhood from Slavery to Civil Rights.] New York: New York University Press, 2011.
Bowman, Vibiana, Editor. Scholarly Resources for Children and Childhood Studies: A Research Guide and Annotated Bibliography. Lanham, MD: Scarecrow Press, 2007.
Cleverley, John and D.C. Phillips (1986) "Visions of Childhood: Influential Models from Locke to Spock." New York, NY: Teachers College Press.
Corsaro, William (2003) ""We're Friends, Right?" Inside Kids' Culture" Washington, DC: Joseph Henry Press
Corsaro, William (2018) https://us.sagepub.com/en-us/nam/the-sociology-of-childhood/book249436 "The Sociology of Childhood" (5th Edition) Thousand Oaks, Ca: Sage.
Hadnot, Ira J. 1998. "Lenzer Champions Growing Field of Children's Studies". The Dallas Morning News. June 21. Sec J p. 1
James, Allison, and James, Adrian (2008) "Key Concepts in Childhood Studies" Sage Publications
James, Allison, and Prout, Alan (1997) "Constructing and Reconstructing Childhood: Contemporary Issues in the Sociological Study of Childhood" Routledge
Kehily, Mary Jane. An Introduction to Childhood Studies. Oxford, UK: Open University Press, 2004.
Klein, Julie Thompson. Interdisciplinarity: History, Theory, and Practice. Detroit, MI: Wayne State University Press, 1990.
Krupp, Anthony. Reason's Children: Childhood in Early Modern Philosophy. Bucknell University Press, 2009.
Lenzer, Gertrud. 2001. "Children's Studies: Beginnings and Purposes." The Lion and the Unicorn Johns Hopkins University Press. (25): 181-186
Lenzer, Gertrud. 1991. "Is There Sufficient Interest to Establish a Sociology of Children?" Footnotes. (19)6 p. 8
Lesnik-Oberstein, Karin (ed.). 1996. Children in Culture: Approaches to Childhood. London: Palgrave.
Lesnik-Oberstein, Karin (ed.). 2011. Children in Culture, Revisited: Further Approaches to Childhood. London: Palgrave.
Mayall, Berry (2002) "Towards a Sociology for Childhood: Thinking from Children's Lives" Open University Press
Mills, Jean, and Richard Mills. Childhood Studies: A Reader in Perspectives of Childhood. London: Routledge, 2000.
Rothstein, Edward. 1998. "How Childhood Has Changed! (Adults, Too)". The New York Times''. February 14. p. B7, B9.
Wells, Karen 2009. Childhood in a Global Perspective. Polity.

Journals
 Childhood. A journal of global child research
 Children and Sociology
 Global Studies of Childhood (https://web.archive.org/web/20110711063458/http://www.wwwords.co.uk/GSCH/)
 Journal of Applied Research for Children (http://digitalcommons.library.tmc.edu/childrenatrisk/) 
Journal of the History of Childhood and Youth
 Sociological Studies of Childhood

Child development
Child welfare in the United States
Child-related organizations in the United States
Childhood
Early childhood education
Human development
Interdisciplinary subfields of sociology